Konstanty Michalski (1879–1947) was a Polish Catholic theologian and philosopher.

Life
Michalski was a member of an order of missionary priests. From 1918 he was a professor of philosophy at—from 1931 rector of— Kraków's Jagiellonian University. From 1927 he was a member of the Polish Academy of Learning.

Michalski was a leading Polish student of medieval philosophy. The chief object of his studies was late, especially 14th-century, Scholasticism and Nominalism in Poland.

Works
Tomizm w Polsce na przełomie XV i XVI w. (Thomism in Poland at the Turn of the 15th and 16th Centuries; 1911)
Odrodzenie nominalizmu w XIV w. (The Rebirth of Nominalism in the 14th Century; 1926).

See also
History of philosophy in Poland
List of Poles

Notes

References
"Michalski, Konstanty," Encyklopedia Powszechna PWN (PWN Universal Encyclopedia), Warsaw, Państwowe Wydawnictwo Naukowe, vol. 3, 1975, p. 104.

1879 births
1947 deaths
Academic staff of Jagiellonian University
20th-century Polish philosophers